Fernando "Nando" Altimani (8 December 1893 – 1 January 1963) was an Italian athlete who competed mainly in the 10 kilometre walk.

Biography
He competed for Italy in the 1912 Summer Olympics held in Stockholm, Sweden in the 10 kilometre walk where he won the bronze medal.

National titles
Fernando Altimani has won 9 times the individual national championship.
5 wins in 1500 m race walk (1910, 1911, 1912, 1913, 1914)
4 wins in 10000 m race walk (1910, 1911, 1912, 1913)

References

External links
 
 

1893 births
1963 deaths
Italian male racewalkers
Olympic bronze medalists for Italy
Athletes (track and field) at the 1912 Summer Olympics
Olympic athletes of Italy
Athletes from Milan
Medalists at the 1912 Summer Olympics
Olympic bronze medalists in athletics (track and field)
20th-century Italian people